Taibaiella helva is a Gram-negative, strictly aerobic, oval-shaped, non-spore-forming and motile bacterium from the genus of Taibaiella which has been isolated from farmland soil from Qianshan in China.

References

Chitinophagia
Bacteria described in 2019